Associate Professor Ong Soh Khim was a Nominated Member of Parliament (NMP) in Singapore from January 2005 to April 2006. She was appointed by Singapore’s President S R Nathan in December 2004.

Background

Born and raised in a working-class family in Singapore, Ong studied at Beatty Primary School, Ang Mo Kio Primary School and Ang Mo Kio Secondary School, and did her A levels at National Junior College from 1987 to 1988.

After enrolling at the National University of Singapore (NUS), Ong received her B.Eng. (Honours in Mechanical Engineering) in 1992. She was awarded her Ph.D. from NUS. She is currently an associate professor at the NUS Department of Mechanical Engineering. She was a member of the NUS Senate Delegacy until June 2013. Her field of study is manufacturing processes and technologies in the department's Manufacturing Division. She specializes in virtual manufacturing, augmented reality application in manufacturing and design.

Notable awards and recognition

IJPR Norman Dudley Award, September 2003.
2004 M. Eugene Merchant SME Outstanding Young Manufacturing Engineer Award, Society of Manufacturing Engineers, November 2003. First ASEAN female to have received this award since the award was established.
2004 Singapore Youth Award, Science & Technology Category, Singapore National Youth Council. 
Samsung DigitAll HOPE Award, November 2005.
The Outstanding Young Person of Singapore Award 2006 (Science and Technology Category), Junior Chamber of Commerce, Singapore.
2009 Emerging Leaders Award in Academia, Society for Women Engineers, US. 1st Singaporean to have received this award since the award was 1st established.
Mitsui Sumitomo Insurance Welfare Foundation (MSIWF) Research Award 2010 Mitsui Sumitomo Insurance Welfare Foundation.
Fellow, International Academy for Production Engineering, CIRP, 2012.

Nominated Member of Parliament

Ong was appointed as a Nominated Member of Parliament (10th Parliament, Second Session) by the president of Singapore in December 2004. She has participated actively and has been vocal in issues such as corporatisation of public universities in Singapore, fee hikes in university education, casino debate, women's rights among others.

References

External links
Official website
Personal website
Asia Inc: Working-class Hero
Profile on the website of Parliament of Singapore
SME awards Ong Soh Khim
Channel News Asia on Ong’s appointment
Ong conferred Singapore Youth Award 2004 for Science & Technology Category

Living people
Singaporean Nominated Members of Parliament
Singaporean engineers
Academic staff of the National University of Singapore
National Junior College alumni
National University of Singapore alumni
Year of birth missing (living people)